Nova União is a municipality located in the Brazilian state of Rondônia. Its population was 6,895 (2020) and its area is 807 km².

References

External links

Municipalities in Rondônia